Craig Chandler Price (born October 11, 1973) is an American serial killer who committed his crimes in Warwick, Rhode Island between the ages of 13 and 15. He was arrested in 1989 for four murders committed in his neighborhood: a woman and her two daughters that year, and the murder of another woman two years earlier. He had an existing criminal record for petty theft.

Price calmly confessed to his crimes after he was discovered. He was arrested a month before his 16th birthday and was tried and convicted as a minor. By law, this meant that he would be released and his criminal records sealed when he turned 21, and Price bragged that he would "make history" when he was released. 

The case led to changes in state law to allow juveniles to be tried as adults for serious crimes, but these could not be applied retroactively to Price. Rhode Island residents formed the group Citizens Opposed to the Release of Craig Price to lobby for his continued imprisonment, due to the brutality of his crimes and the opinion of state psychologists that he was a poor candidate for rehabilitation.

During his incarceration, Price has been charged with additional crimes, including criminal contempt for refusing a psychological evaluation, extortion for threatening a corrections officer, assault, and violation of probation for fights while in prison. He was sentenced to an additional 10–25 years, depending on his cooperation with treatment. Craig Price is the youngest serial killer in U.S. history.

Details of the murders
Price committed his first murder at the age of 13 in Warwick, Rhode Island on the night of July 27, 1987, Price broke into a home that was only two houses away from his own whereupon he took a knife from the kitchen and stabbed 27-year-old Rebecca Spencer 58 times, killing her.

A little over two years later, Price was a 15 year old freshman in high school when he murdered three other neighbors on September 1, 1989. Price, high on marijuana and LSD, stabbed 39 year old Joan Heaton 57 times, her 10-year-old daughter Jennifer 62 times, and crushed the skull of Heaton's 7-year-old daughter Melissa, and inflicted 30 stab wounds. The stabbings were so brutal that the handles broke off the knives he used, with the blades staying inside the bodies of the victims. 

At the time, the brutality of the murders was mostly unknown due to Price's sealed records. According to law-enforcement officials, Price had no remorse when confessing to the crimes, and as for the motive, Price himself claimed racism by white people beginning when he was a young child was a factor and that the first time he wanted someone to die was when a group of white adults allegedly shouted racial slurs at him and tried to run him over with their car when he was a young boy.

Prison violence
An officer from the Rhode Island Department of Corrections said Price has been booked twice for fighting since leaving the Adult Correctional Institutions in Cranston. Price was denied parole in March 2009 and his release date was set for May 2020. In 2004, he was transferred from Rhode Island to Florida to serve his time due to his violent tendencies.

In Florida on July 29, 2009, Craig was involved in a prison fight with another inmate. While trying to break up the fight, one of the correctional officers was stabbed in the finger by a handmade shiv in Price's possession. In the wake of the prison fight, Price was transferred to another facility. 

On April 4, 2017, Price was accused of stabbing fellow inmate Joshua Davis at the Suwannee Correctional Institution in Live Oak, Florida with a 5" homemade knife. On January 18, 2019, he was sentenced to 25 years for the crime.

See also 
 List of serial killers in the United States

References

Further reading
A Call For Justice: A New England Town's Fight To Keep A Stone Cold Killer In Jail, Denise Lang; Avon Press, April 4, 2000
A lengthy, in-depth article featuring multiple interviews with Craig Price
Juvenile Serial Killer Remains in Prison

1973 births
1987 murders in the United States 
1989 murders in the United States 
20th-century American criminals
African-American people
American male criminals
American murderers of children
American people convicted of murder
American serial killers
Crime in Rhode Island
Criminals from Rhode Island
History of Rhode Island
Incidents of violence against girls
Living people
Male serial killers
Minors convicted of murder
People convicted of murder by Rhode Island
People from Warwick, Rhode Island
Racially motivated violence against European Americans
Violence against women in the United States
American people convicted of attempted murder